Thomas Stuart Chalmers (June 1816 – July 13, 1903) was a Scottish-born American businessman. A pioneer of Chicago industry, he founded Fraser & Chalmers, a precursor to Allis-Chalmers (now part of AGCO).

Life
Chalmers was born in Dronley, Scotland, in June of 1816. He emigrated to the United States around 1842.

In 1872, Chalmers founded Fraser & Chalmers in Chicago. By 1880, the company employed over 170 workers. Frasers & Chalmers produced mining machinery, boilers, and pumps, becoming one of the largest mining manufacturing companies in the world by 1890.

Chalmers died at his home at 179 Ashland Boulevard in Chicago on June 28th, 1903.

Chalmers' son William served as President of Allis-Chalmers.

Legacy
The Chalmers School of Excellence in Chicago is named in honor of Thomas Chalmers.

See also

Allis-Chalmers

References

External links
Thomas Chalmers House at 315 South Ashland Boulevard, Connecting the Windy City blog
The Men Behind The Allis-Chalmers Brand, The Badge Factory

1816 births
1903 deaths
American businesspeople
American Freemasons
People from Angus, Scotland
People from Chicago
Scottish emigrants to the United States